Hyperactive describes someone or something exhibiting hyperactivity.

Hyperactive may also refer to:

"Hyperactive!", a song by Thomas Dolby from The Flat Earth
 "Hyperactive" (Robert Palmer song), 1985
"Hyperactive", a song by Raven from The Pack Is Back
"Hyperactive", a song by Kill Hannah from American Jet Set
"Hyperactive", a song by GMS from No Rules
"Hyperactive", a song by The Donnas from Get Skintight
HyperActive, a multimedia arts publication published by Resource Central
"Hyperactive", a YouTube video by Lasse Gjertsen